Para-aminohippurate (PAH) clearance is a method used in renal physiology to measure renal plasma flow, which is a measure of renal function.

PAH is completely removed from blood that passes through the kidneys (PAH undergoes both glomerular filtration and tubular secretion), and therefore the rate at which the kidneys can clear PAH from the blood reflects total renal plasma flow.

The concentration of PAH is measured in one arterial blood sample (PPAH) and one urine sample(UPAH). The urine flow (V) is also measured. Renal perfusion flow is then calculated by:

What is calculated is the effective renal plasma flow (eRPF). However, since the renal extraction ratio of PAH almost equals 1, then eRPF almost equals RPF.

Precision
The renal extraction ratio of PAH in a normal individual is approximately 0.92, and thus not exactly 1.0. Thus, this method usually underestimates RPF by approximately 10%. This margin of error is generally acceptable considering the ease with which eRPF is measured.

See also
 Renal blood flow

References

External links
 Renal Clearance Techniques

Renal physiology
Blood tests